Mohamad Khairul Rizam bin Che Soh (born 22 August 1996) is a Malaysian professional footballer who plays as a forward.

Career statistics

Club

References

External links
 

Living people
1996 births
People from Kelantan
Malaysian people of Malay descent
Malaysian footballers
Terengganu F.C. II players
Kelantan F.C. players
Kelantan United F.C. players
Association football forwards
Malaysia Super League players